Williwaw Rocks is two small rocks lying 2 nautical miles (3.7 km) south of Moody Point, the east extremity of Joinville Island. Surveyed by the Falkland Islands Dependencies Survey (FIDS) in 1953. The name arose because williwaws appear to be characteristic in the vicinity of Moody Point and the nearby Danger Islands.

Rock formations of the Joinville Island group